Douglas McKay High School, most commonly known as McKay, is a public high school located in the North Lancaster neighborhood of Salem, Oregon, United States. Built in 1979, the school was named after Douglas McKay, former Governor of Oregon and United States Secretary of the Interior.

History
In 1976 the city of Salem announced an interest in annexing the school's site.

Academics

In the 2015–2016 school year, 72.1% of McKay's seniors received a high school diploma, compared to a statewide rate of 74.8%.

As of the 2017–2018 school year, McKay offers a wide range of courses and extra-curricular activities to its students.

Notable alumni
 Ryan Bailey (2007) - U.S. Olympic team member - 100 meter dash,  400 meter relay team (silver medal) 
 Dave Brundage (1983) - professional baseball player and minor league manager
 Gus Envela, Jr. (1986) - Olympic runner for Equatorial Guinea
 Ron Funches (2001) - actor, comedian

References

Educational institutions established in 1979
High schools in Salem, Oregon
School buildings completed in 1979
Public high schools in Oregon
1979 establishments in Oregon